Chapramari Railway Station is a very small railway station which serves the areas of Chapramari–Doars region in the Indian state of West Bengal. The station lies on New Jalpaiguri–Alipurduar–Samuktala Road line of Northeast Frontier Railway zone, Alipurduar railway division. Due to its location inside Chapramari Wildlife Sanctuary, no trains have stoppages here. The passengers of these areas have to go to nearby  and  stations to board trains.

References

Railway stations in West Bengal
Alipurduar railway division
Railway stations in Jalpaiguri district